Peel Association Football Club is a football club from Peel on the Isle of Man. The team competes in the Isle of Man Football League and the players wear red, white and black kits. The Peel A.F.C. plays its home games at the Peel A.F.C. Football Ground, on Douglas Road in Peel.

History
Formed on 1 October 1888, they are the most successful club on the island with 29 league titles and 32 victories in the Manx FA Cup. They were the first winners of the Isle of Man Football League in 1897.

The club has a reserve team that plays in the Isle of Man Football Combination. They also have a ladies team and an under 18 League team.

Amongst the many players who have appeared for the club, the two most famous are Tony Williams and Rick Holden.  Williams scored 24 goals for the first team in 1958 in only ten appearances prior to compiling the Rothmans Football Yearbook and the Football League Club Directory.  Holden, who appeared for Oldham Athletic and Manchester City amongst his professional clubs, scored 47 goals for Peel's first team in 48 appearances (1996–97) and later had two spells as manager.  He resigned in August 2010 and was replaced by Peter Kennaugh.
Daniel Bell took over as Director of Football during September 2020 to steady the ship.

Stadium
Peel's ground is located on Douglas Road at the eastern edge of Peel. The ground has a small covered terrace.

Honours

League
First Division champions (29): 1896–97, 1906–07, 1921–22, 1931–32, 1932–33, 1933–34, 1934–35 1947–48, 1948–49, 1952–53, 1953–54, 1954–55, 1957–58, 1958–59, 1959–60, 1962–63, 1963–64, 1964–65, 1965–66, 1971–72, 1972–73, 1973–74, 1974–75, 1975–76, 1976–77, 1983–84, 1999–00, 2000–01, 2001–02
Manx FA Cup (32): 1890–91, 1891–92 (Shared), 1908–09, 1926–27, 1929–30, 1932–33, 1934–35, 1936–37, 1938–39, 1945–46, 1947–48, 1948–49, 1952–53, 1953–54, 1957–58, 1958–59, 1959–60, 1960–61, 1962–63, 1963–64, 1968–69, 1972–73, 1973–74, 1974–75, 1976–77 1981–82 1983–84 1996–97 1998–99, 2006–07, 2015–16, 2018–19
Hospital Cup (17): 1924–25, 1928–29, 1931–32, 1932–33, 1933–34, 1937–38, 1967–68, 1979–70, 1971–72, 1972–73, 1976–77, 1979–80, 1989–90, 1990–91, 1996–97, 1998–99, 2009–10
Railway Cup (22): 1932–33, 1936–37, 1946–47, 1954–55, 1956–57, 1960–61, 1961–62, 1965–66, 1968–69, 1969–70, 1970–71, 1971–72, 1972–73, 1973–74, 1980–81, 1981–82, 1998–99, 2002–03, 2006–07, 2007–08, 2009–10, 2018–19

References

External links
Official club website

Football clubs in the Isle of Man
Peel, Isle of Man
Association football clubs established in 1888
1888 establishments in the Isle of Man